The 1932 Denver Pioneers football team was an American football team that represented the University of Denver as a member of the Rocky Mountain Conference (RMC) during the 1932 college football season. In their first season under head coach Percy Locey, the Pioneers compiled a 4–3–1 record  (4–1–1 against conference opponents), finished third in the RMC, and were outscored by a total of 74 to 60.

Schedule

References

Denver
Denver Pioneers football seasons
Denver Pioneers football